CT (stood for City Television) was a 24-hour Filipino cable and satellite television network based in Mandaluyong. It was launched on March 22, 2015. Owned by Solar Entertainment Corporation, replacing Jack City, a defunct spin-off of sister channel Jack TV. This channel was formerly broadcast on all local pay TV and cable operators in the Philippines.

History

2011–2012: Chase
During its initial launch on BEAM Channel 31, Chase was a general entertainment channel that was male-focused air during nighttime, while sharing its channel with the game show channel, TGC, which aired during daytimes. In late February 2012, the former announced in an on-screen graphic during its shows that it was switching to a 24-hour broadcast, therefore remaining on channel 31 while the latter was spin-off into its own channel on select cable providers.

2012–2015: Jack City
On September 7, 2012, Chase announced through on-screen graphics and various plugs that it was going to be replaced by a spin-off of sister channel Jack TV. On October 20, 2012, Jack City was launched. With some of Chase's programs carried onto its roster. The full broadcast was released on November 11, 2012.

On June 28, 2013, the channel's airing hours were reduced to 18 hours a day on free TV, in compliance with the National Telecommunications Commission's guidelines. However, it still continues to air 24 hours a day as a cable channel. On September 1, 2014, Jack City ended its run on free TV. This move resulted in a change of its channel assignment for SkyCable and Destiny Cable (Digital) subscribers.

2015–2017: CT
On March 22, 2015, Jack City was replaced by CT, thus becoming independent from its parent network. Upon launch, the channel broadened its programming focus by adding talk shows, sitcoms and men's lifestyle programs to its roster.

Dispute with Sky Cable and Digital test broadcast
On April 10, 2017, Sky Cable & Destiny Cable dropped CT along with Basketball TV, Jack TV, Solar Sports & NBA Premium TV allegedly due to Sky Cable's unpaid carriage fees.

On December 31, 2017 at 11:59 pm, CT signed off after 2 years of broadcasting. CT got shut down due to low ratings.

Final programming

See also
Solar Entertainment Corporation
CHASE
Jack City

References

Defunct television networks in the Philippines
Former Solar Entertainment Corporation channels
English-language television stations in the Philippines
Television channels and stations established in 2015
Television channels and stations disestablished in 2017
2015 establishments in the Philippines
2017 disestablishments in the Philippines